Temperate rainforests are coniferous or broadleaf forests that occur in the temperate zone and receive heavy rain.

Temperate rain forests occur in oceanic moist regions around the world: the Pacific temperate rain forests of North American Pacific Northwest as well as the Appalachian temperate rainforest of the Eastern U.S. Sun Belt; the Valdivian temperate rain forests of southwestern South America; the rain forests of New Zealand and southeastern Australia; northwest Europe (small pockets in Great Britain and larger areas in Ireland, southern Norway and northern Iberia); southern Japan; the Black Sea–Caspian Sea region from the southeasternmost coastal zone of the Bulgarian coast, through Turkey, to Georgia, and northern Iran.

The moist conditions of temperate rain forests generally support an understory of mosses, ferns and some shrubs and berries. Temperate rain forests can be temperate coniferous forests or temperate broadleaf and mixed forests.

Definition

For temperate rainforests of North America, Alaback's definition is widely recognized:
 Mean annual temperature is between 4 and 12 °C (39 and 54 °F).
However, required annual precipitation depends on factors such as distribution of rain over the year, temperatures over the year and fog presence, and definitions in other regions of the world differ considerably. For example, Australian definitions are ecological-structural rather than climatic:
 Closed canopy of trees excludes at least 69% of the sky.
 Forest is composed mainly of tree species which do not require fire for regeneration, but with seedlings able to regenerate under shade and in natural openings.
The latter would, for example, exclude a part of the temperate rain forests of western North America, as Coast Douglas-fir, one of its dominant tree species, requires stand-destroying disturbance to initiate a new cohort of seedlings. The North American definition would in turn exclude a part of temperate rain forests under definitions used elsewhere.

Canopy level

For forests, canopy refers to the upper layer or habitat zone, formed by mature tree crowns and including other biological organisms (epiphytes, lianas, arboreal animals, etc.). The canopy level is the third level of the temperate rainforest. The trees forming the canopy, conifers, can stand as tall as 100 meters or more. A variety of species survive in the canopy. The tops of these trees collect most of the rain, moisture, and photosynthesis that the rainforest takes in. They form a canopy over the forest, covering about 95% of the floor during the summer.

The canopy's coverage affects the shade tolerance levels of forest floor plants. When the canopy is in full bloom, covering about 95% of the floor, plant survival decreases. Some plant species have become shade tolerant in order to survive. 
The treetops take in the heavy amount of rain and keep the lower levels of the forest damp.

The canopy survives through photosynthesis. The leaves provide energy and nutrients for the trees, which provide homes and food for the forest. Through satellite data, the radiation use efficiency (RUE) calculates the annual amount of photosynthesis that occurs in temperate rainforests. A diverse amount of photosynthesis occurs based on the location and microclimates of the forest.

Global distribution

Temperate forests cover a large part of the Earth, but temperate rainforests only occur in a few regions around the world. Most of these occur in oceanic moist climates: the Pacific temperate rain forests in Western North America (Southeastern Alaska to Central California), the Valdivian and Magellanic temperate rainforests of southwestern South America (Southern Chile and adjacent Argentina), pockets of rain forest in Northwestern Europe (southern Norway to northern Spain), temperate rainforests of southeastern Australia (Tasmania and Victoria) and the New Zealand temperate rainforests (South Island's west coast).

Others occur in subtropical moist climates; South Africa's Knysna-Amatole coastal forests, the Colchan rainforests of the Black Sea region (southeast corner of Bulgaria, Turkey and Georgia), the Caspian temperate rainforests of Iran and Azerbaijan, the mountain temperate rainforests along eastern Taiwan's Pacific coast, the eastern coast of the Korean Peninsula along the length of the Baekdu Mountain Range and in the area surrounding Mt. Jiri and across the peninsula's southern coastline, southwest Japan's Taiheiyo forests, coastal New South Wales and New Zealand's North Island.

Additionally pockets of temperate rainforest occur in dreary climates that are not categorized by just annual precipitation but also number of cloudy days as well as number of days of measurable precipitation in the form of rain or snow. In Western North America, the Columbia Mountains of British Columbia, northern Idaho and northwestern Montana have more of a continental climate and have pockets of temperate coniferous rainforest.

In Eastern North America, there are scattered pockets of temperate rainforest along the Allegheny Plateau and adjacent parts of the Appalachian Mountains from West Virginia to New England. These areas include sections of West Virginia, Western North Carolina, and Western Pennsylvania, as well as Western New York and the Adirondack Mountains. A good example of these forests are found in Zoar Valley in Western New York (nearest major city is Buffalo, New York), Cook Forest State Park within the Allegheny National Forest (nearest major city is Pittsburgh), and Cathedral State Park in West Virginia.

In Eastern Asia, there are scattered pockets of temperate rainforest in what is known as the Russian Far East (Ussuri, Outer Manchuria, Sakhalin) in Asia where the climate is also continental in nature, but get enough precipitation and cloud cover to harbor significant pockets of temperate rainforest. Like Eastern North America, much precipitation is in the form of rain and snow. The mountainous coniferous forests of the Changbai Mountains bordering China and North Korea are also a good example, containing some of the richest high-elevation coniferous evergreen forests in East Asia.

Temperate rain forest regions by continent

North America

Pacific temperate rain forests

A portion of the temperate rain forest region of North America, the largest area of temperate zone rain forests on the planet, is the Pacific temperate rain forests ecoregion, which occur on west-facing coastal mountains along the Pacific coast of North America, from Kodiak Island in Alaska to northern California, and are part of the Nearctic realm. In the different system established by the Commission for Environmental Cooperation, this same general region is classed as the Pacific Maritime Ecozone by Environment Canada and as the Marine West Coast Forest and Northwestern Forested Mountains Level II ecoregions by the United States Environmental Protection Agency. In terms of the floristic province system used by botany, the bulk of the region is the Rocky Mountain Floristic Region but a small southern portion is part of the California Floristic Province.

Sub-ecoregions of the Pacific temperate rain forest ecoregion as defined by the WWF include the Northern Pacific coastal forests, Haida Gwaii ecoregion, Vancouver Island ecoregion, British Columbia mainland coastal forests, Central Pacific coastal forests, Cascades forests, Klamath-Siskiyou coastal forests, and Northern California coastal forests ecoregions. They vary in their species composition, but are all predominantly coniferous, sometimes with an understory of broadleaved trees and shrubs. Most of the precipitation occurs in winter, similar to Mediterranean climates, but in summer, fog moisture is extracted by the trees and produces a fog drip keeping the forest moist. The Northern California coastal forests are home to the Coast Redwood (Sequoia sempervirens), the world's tallest tree. In the other ecoregions, Coast Douglas-fir (Pseudotsuga menziesii var. menziesii), Sitka Spruce (Picea sitchensis), Western Hemlock (Tsuga heterophylla) and Western redcedar (Thuja plicata) are the most important tree species. A common feature of Pacific temperate rain forests of North America is the Nurse log, a fallen tree which as it decays, provides ecological facilitation to seedlings. Trees such as the Coast Douglas-fir, Western Hemlock, Western Red Cedar, Pacific Yew, and Vine Maple are more closely related to coniferous and deciduous trees in the temperate forests of East Asia.

Some of the largest expanses of old growth are found in Olympic National Park, Mount Rainier National Park, Tongass National Forest, Mount St. Helens National Monument, Redwood National Park, and throughout British Columbia (including British Columbia's Coastal Mountain Ranges), with the coastal Great Bear Rainforest containing the largest expanses of old growth temperate rainforest found in the world.

British Columbia's Rocky Mountains, Cariboo Mountains, Rocky Mountain Trench (east of Prince George) and the Columbia Mountains of Southeastern British Columbia (west of the Canadian Rocky Mountains that extend into parts of Idaho and Northwestern Montana in the US), which include the Selkirk Mountains, Monashee Mountains, and the Purcell Mountains, have the largest stretch of interior temperate coniferous rain forests. These inland rainforests have more continental climate with a large proportion of the precipitation falling as snow. Being closer to the Rocky Mountains, there is more of a diverse mammalian fauna. Some of the best interior rain forests are found in Mount Revelstoke National Park and Glacier National Park (Canada) in the Columbia Mountains.

Appalachian temperate rain forests 

Temperate rain forests are located in the southern Appalachian Mountains where orographic precipitation increases precipitation of weather systems coming from the west and from the Gulf of Mexico. Temperate rainforest extends through the Appalachian areas of western North Carolina, southeastern Kentucky, southwest Virginia, eastern Tennessee, northern South Carolina, and northern Georgia.

Red spruce and Fraser fir are dominant canopy trees in high mountain areas. In higher elevation (over 1,980 metres (6,500 ft)), Fraser fir is dominant, in middle elevation (1,675 to 1,890 metres (5,495 to 6,201 ft)) red spruce and Fraser fir grow together, and in lower elevation (1,370 to 1,650 metres (4,490 to 5,410 ft)) red spruce is dominant. Yellow birch, mountain ash, and mountain maple grow in the understory. Younger spruce and fir and shrubs like raspberry, blackberry, hobblebush, southern mountain cranberries, red elderberry, minniebush, southern bush honeysuckle are understory vegetation. Below the spruce-fir forest, at around 1,200 metres (3,900 ft), are forests of American beech, yellow birch, maple birch, and oak.[9] Skunk cabbage and ground juniper are northern species that were pushed into the areas from the north.

The mild and wet environment supports the high diversity of fungi. Over 2,000 species live in this area and scientists estimate many unidentified fungi may be there.[10]

South America

Valdivian and Magellanic temperate rainforests

The temperate rain forests of South America are located on the Pacific coast of southern Chile, on the west-facing slopes of the southern Chilean coast range, and the Andes Mountains in both Chile and Western Argentina down to the southern tip of South America, and are part of the Neotropical realm. Temperate rain forests occur in the Valdivian temperate rain forests and Magellanic subpolar forests ecoregions. The Valdivian rainforests are home to a variety of broadleaf evergreen trees, like Aextoxicon punctatum, Eucryphia cordifolia, and southern beech (Nothofagus), but include many conifers as well, notably Alerce (Fitzroya cupressoides), one of the largest tree species of the world. 

The Valdivian and Magellanic temperate rainforests are the only temperate rain forests in South America. Together they are the second largest in the world, after the Pacific temperate rain forests of North America. The Valdivian forests are a refuge for the Antarctic flora, and share many plant families and genera with the temperate rainforests of New Zealand, Tasmania, and Australia. Fully half the species of woody plants are endemic to this ecoregion.

In the Valdivian region the Andean Cordillera intercepts moist westerly winds along the Pacific coast during winter and summer months; these winds cool as they ascend the mountains, creating heavy rainfall on the mountains' west-facing slopes. The northward-flowing oceanic Humboldt Current creates humid and foggy conditions near the coast. The tree line is at about 2,400 m in the northern part of the ecoregion (35°S), and descends to 1,000 m in the south of the Valdivian region.

Africa

Knysna-Amatole coastal rain forests (South Africa)

The temperate rainforests of South Africa are part of the Knysna-Amatole forests that are located along South Africa's Garden Route between Cape Town and Port Elizabeth on the south-facing slopes of South Africa's Drakensberg Mountains facing the Indian Ocean. There are several coniferous podocarps that grow here. This forest receives a lot of moisture as fog from the Indian Ocean, and resembles not only other temperate rain forests worldwide, but also the montane evergreen Afromontane forests that occur at higher elevations in southern and eastern Africa. A fine example of this forest is in South Africa's Tsitsikamma National Park.

Europe
Temperate rainforest occurs in fragments across the north and west of Europe in countries such as southern Norway (see Scandinavian coastal conifer forests) and northern Spain. Other temperate rainforest regions include areas of south eastern Europe such as mountains on the east coast of the Adriatic Sea, surrounding North Western Bulgaria along with the Black Sea.

Atlantic Oakwood forest (Britain and Ireland)

The woodlands are variously referred to in Britain as Upland Oakwoods, Atlantic Oakwoods, Western Oakwoods or Temperate Rainforest, Caledonian forest, and colloquially as 'Celtic Rainforests'. They are also listed in the British National Vegetation Classification as British NVC community W11 and British NVC community W17 depending on the ground flora. The majority of surviving fragments of Atlantic Oakwoods in Britain occur on steep-sided slopes above rivers and lakes which have avoided clearance and intensive grazing pressure. There are notable examples on the islands and shores of Loch Maree, Loch Sunart, Loch Lomond and one of the best preserved sites on the remote Taynish Peninsula in Argyll. There are also small areas on steep-sided riverine gorges in Snowdonia and Mid Wales, such as found at the Dolmelynllyn Estate in Gwynedd. 

In England, they occur in the Lake District (Borrowdale Woods) and steep sided riverine and estuarine valleys in Devon and Cornwall and the Microclimate disused slate & granite quarries in these counties. This includes the Fowey valley in Cornwall and the valley of the river Dart which flows off Dartmoor and has rainfall in excess of 2 metres per year.

Derrycunnihy Wood, located in the Killarney National Park, is the best example of the ancient damp-climate oceanic forest that covered an estimated 80 percent of Ireland prior to the arrival of humans in 7,000 BCE.

Guy Shrubsole's Lost Rainforests of Britain attempts to find, map, photograph, and restore them.

Colchian (Colchis) rain forests (Bulgaria, Turkey and Georgia)
The Colchian rainforests are found around both the southeast and west corners of the Black Sea starting in Bulgaria all the way to Turkey and Georgia and are part of the Euxine-Colchic deciduous forests ecoregion, together with the drier Euxine forests further west. The Colchian rain forests are mixed, with deciduous black alder (Alnus glutinosa), hornbeam (Carpinus betulus and C. orientalis), Oriental beech (Fagus orientalis), and sweet chestnut (Castanea sativa) together with evergreen Nordmann fir (Abies nordmanniana, the tallest tree in Europe at 78 m), Caucasian spruce (Picea orientalis) and Scots pine (Pinus sylvestris).
The refugium is the largest throughout the Western Asian/ near Eastern region. The area has multiple representatives of disjunct relict groups of plants with the closest relatives in Eastern Asia, southern Europe, and even North America. Over 70 species of forest snails of the region are endemic. Some relict species of vertebrates are Caucasian parsley frog, Caucasian salamander, Robert's snow vole and Caucasian grouse; they are almost entirely endemic groups of animals such as lizards of genus Darevskia. In general, species composition of this refugium is quite distinct and differs from that of the other Western Eurasian refugia. 
Genetic data suggest that the Colchis temperate rainforest, during the Ice Age, was fragmented into smaller parts; in particular, evolutionary lineages of the Caucasian Salamander from the central and south-western Colchis remained isolated from one another during the entire Ice Age.

Fragas do Eume (Spain)

The  is a natural park situated in Galicia, north-western Spain.  is a Galician word for 'natural woodland', (old-growth forest) and the park is an example of a temperate rainforest in which oak (Quercus robur and Quercus pyrenaica) is the climax vegetation. Some 500 people reside within the park. The monastery of Monastery of  also lies within the park.

The area was declared a natural park (a level of protection lower than national park) in 1997. It is one of six natural parks in Galicia. The European Union has recognised the park as a Site of Community Importance. There are a number of species of ferns. Invertebrate species include the Kerry slug and it is an important site for amphibians.

Vinatovača rainforest (Serbia) 

The Vinatovača rainforest, alternatively spelled vintovača, is the only rainforest in Serbia. It has been left undisturbed for centuries due to strict conservation laws starting in the 17th century.

It is isolated and hard to reach which helped its preservation. It is believed that trees have not been cut in Vinatovača since about 1650. Being under strict protection means not only that the trees that die of old age are not being cleared or removed, but even picking herbs or mushrooms is forbidden. It is considered as an example of what central and eastern Serbia's natural look is.

Asia

Caspian Hyrcanian forest (Iran and Azerbaijan)
The Caspian Hyrcanian mixed forests ecoregion in northern Iran contains a jungle in the form of a rain forest which stretches from the east in the Khorasan province to the west in the Ardabil Province, covering the other provinces of Gilan, Mazandaran, and Golestan. The Elburz or Alborz mountain range is the highest mountain range in the Middle East which captures the moisture of the Caspian Sea to its north and forms subtropical and temperate rain forests in the northern part of Iran. The Iranians call this forest and region Shomal which means north in Persian. This forest was known for most of the history for being home to the now extinct Caspian Tiger.

In southeast Azerbaijan, this ecoregion includes the Lankaran Lowland and the Talysh Mountains, the latter being evenly divided with Iran to the south. They are deciduous forests containing tree species such as black alder (Alnus glutinosa subsp. barbata), hornbeam (Carpinus betulus and C. orientalis), Caucasian wingnut (Pterocarya fraxinifolia), chestnut-leaved oak (Quercus castaneifolia), Caucasian oak (Quercus macranthera), oriental beech (Fagus orientalis), Persian ironwood (Parrotia persica) and Persian silk tree (Albizia julibrissin).

The existing protected areas in Azerbaijan include:

 Gizil-Agach State Reserve – 
 Hirkan National Park – 
 Zuvand National Park – 
 Girkan State Reserve –

High elevation mountain rain forests (Taiwan)
These forests are found in eastern Taiwan and Taiwan's Central Mountain Ranges, part of the Taiwan subtropical evergreen forest region covering the higher elevations. Most of the lower elevations are covered by subtropical broadleaf evergreen forests, dominated by Chinese Cryptocarya (Cryptocarya chinensis), Castanopsis hystrix and Japanese Blue Oak (Quercus glauca). Higher elevations give way to temperate forests with large stands of old growth Taiwan Cypress (Chamaecyparis taiwanensis), Camphor tree (Cinnamomum camphora), maple (Acer spp.), Chinese yew (Taxus chinensis), Taiwan Hemlock (Tsuga chinensis), and Taiwan Douglas-fir (Pseudotsuga sinensis var. wilsoniana). These higher elevation forests include also giant conifers Formosan Cypress (Chamaecyparis formosensis) and Taiwania (Taiwania cryptomerioides) Some fine examples of forests are found in Yushan (Jade Mountain) National Park and Alishan.

Baekdu Mountain Range (Taebaek and Sobaek Mountain Ranges) and South Sea forests (Korea)

The forests that cover the mountains and valleys of the Baekdu Mountain Range – from Mt. Baekdu, in the north, to Mt. Jiri, in the southwest, forming the spine of the Korean Peninsula – and the southern coast and islands of the peninsula – including Jeju Island – feature a wide variety of conifers and broadleaf trees. Much of these forests are protected in mountain and marine national forests, such as in Hallyeohaesang National Park, which encompasses  of mountainous forests spread out over 69 uninhabited islands and 30 inhabited islands in Korea's South Sea that provide a home to 1,142 plant species, including major species such as red pine, black pine, common camellia, serrata oak, and cork oak, as well as rare species such as nadopungnan (sedirea japonica), daeheongnan (cymbidium nipponicum) and the Korean winter hazel. Major animals species, such as otters, small-eared cats, and badgers also call Hallyeohaesang National Park home, and overall there are 25 mammal species, 115 bird species, 16 reptile species, 1,566 insect species, and 24 freshwater fish species found among the forested, mountains islands.

Over 2,000 animal species live in Seoraksan, including the Korean goral, musk deer, and there are also more than 1,400 rare plant species, such as the edelweiss.

Taiheiyo (Pacific) rain forests (Japan)

Southwestern Japan's Taiheiyo evergreen forests region covers much of Shikoku and Kyūshū Islands, and the Southern/Pacific Ocean-facing side of Honshu ("Taiheiyo" is the Pacific Ocean, in Japanese). Here the natural forests are mainly broadleaf evergreen in lower elevations and deciduous in higher elevations. The Hydrangea hirta species is an endemic deciduous species that can be found in this area. The limit occurs at 500–1000 metres depending on latitude. The main tree species are members of beech family (Fagaceae). In lower altitudes these include evergreen oaks (Quercus spp.), Japanese Chinquapin (Castanopsis cuspidata) and Japanese Stone Oak (Lithocarpus edulis), and in higher altitudes Japanese Blue Beech (Fagus japonica) and Siebold's beech (Fagus crenata).

Some of the best preserved examples of forest are found in Kirishima-Yaku National Park on the Island of Yakushima off of Kyūshū in a very wet climate (the annual rainfall is 4,000 to 10,000 mm depending on altitude). Because of relatively infertile soils on granite, Yakushima's forests in higher elevations are dominated by a giant conifer species, Japanese Cedar (Cryptomeria japonica), rather than deciduous forests typical of the mainland. Other areas include Mount Kirishima near Kagoshima in southern Kyūshū. On Southern Honshū, there is a forest with the Nachi Falls located in Yoshino-Kumano National Park. This particular area of Honshū has been described as one of the rainiest spots in Japan.

Eastern Himalayan broadleaf forests (Bhutan, India, Nepal) 

It is a temperate broadleaf forest ecoregion found in the middle elevations of the eastern Himalayas, including parts of Nepal, India, and Bhutan.

Southern Siberian rainforest

Temperate rainforests of the Russian Far East

Oceania

Australian temperate rainforests

In Australia rainforests occur near the mainland east coast and in Tasmania. There are warm-temperate and cool-temperate rainforests. They are broadleaf evergreen forests with the exception of montane rainforests of Tasmania. Eucalypt forests are not classified as rainforests although some eucalypt forest types receive high annual rainfall (to over 2000 mm in Tasmania), and in the absence of fire they may develop to rainforest. If these widespread wet sclerophyll forests were considered rainforests, the total area of rainforest in Australia would be much larger.

Warm-temperate rainforest replaces subtropical rainforest on poorer soils or with increasing altitude and latitude in New South Wales and Victoria. Cool-temperate rainforests are widespread in Tasmania (Tasmanian temperate rain forests ecoregion) and they can be found scattered from the World Heritage listed Border Ranges National Park and Lamington National Park on the NSW/Queensland border to Otway Ranges, Strzelecki Ranges, Dandenong Ranges and Tarra Bulga in Victoria. In the northern NSW they are usually dominated by Antarctic Beech (Nothofagus moorei), in the southern NSW by Pinkwood (Eucryphia moorei) and Coachwood (Ceratopetalum apetalum) and in Victoria and Tasmania by Myrtle Beech (Nothofagus cunninghamii), Southern Sassafras (Atherosperma moschatum) and Mountain Ash (Eucalyptus regnans). The montane rainforests of Tasmania are dominated by Tasmanian endemic conifers (mainly Athrotaxis spp.). They are dominated by Ferns such as Cyathea cooperi, Cyathea australis, Dicksonia antarctica, Cyathea cunninghamii and Cyathea leichhardtiana.

New Zealand temperate rainforests
The temperate rainforests of New Zealand occur on the western shore of the South Island and on the North Island. The forests are made up of coniferous podocarps and broadleaf evergreen trees. The podocarps are abundant at lower elevations, while southern beech (Nothofagus) can be found on higher slopes and in the cooler southernmost rainforests. Ecoregions include the Fiordland temperate forests and Westland temperate rainforests.

References

External links

 The Rainforests of Home, an atlas of People and Place – from Inforain
 Teacher Pages: Temperate Rainforest (Wheeling University)
 Southeast Alaska Conservation Council – preserving rainforests in Southeast Alaska
 Raincoast – preserving rainforests in coastal British Columbia's Great Bear Rainforest
 The Warm and Cool Temperate Rainforests of Australia
 Temperate Rainforests of North America's Pacific Coast

Temperate rainforests
 
 
Forests
Habitats